Harmonious is a multimedia, fireworks-based nighttime spectacular at Epcot at the Walt Disney World Resort in Bay Lake, Florida. Serving as the long-term replacement of IllumiNations: Reflections of Earth, Harmonious showcases and celebrates the cultures and stories of the world that have inspired various Disney films and music, and how it can unite us all, overcoming any language or border. The show utilizes pyrotechnics, choreographed water fountains, water curtains, lasers, searchlights, and LED screens to present a 360° audio-visual experience on the park's World Showcase Lagoon. The primary show equipment is notably housed on a collective of floating barges that are permanently moored at the center of the lagoon. Harmonious is described as the largest nighttime spectacular ever created by Disney Live Entertainment.

Conceptualized by then-chairman of Disney Parks, Experiences and Products and former CEO of The Walt Disney Company, Bob Chapek, and developed further by Disney Live Entertainment under the direction of its Vice President of Parades and Spectaculars, Steve Davison, Harmonious is a celebration of the Disney stories and songs that have inspired and empowered the world, emphasizing its ability to unite people from all walks of life. Told through reimagined and reinterpreted Disney visuals and music by 240 international artists, the show is divided into three chapters: "Gather", "Celebrate", and "Unite".

The show was first announced at the biennial D23 Destination D event in 2018. Originally set to premiere in 2020 after the limited run of its direct predecessor Epcot Forever, the show was delayed to September 29, 2021, due to the COVID-19 pandemic.

On June 21, 2022, a special livestream of the show was broadcast on Disney+, hosted by Idina Menzel with narration by Auliʻi Cravalho and the music performed by a live orchestra, choir, mariachi band, gospel choir, and singers.

On September 11, 2022, at D23 2022, it was announced that Harmonious would be replaced with another nighttime spectacular in 2023 during Disney's 100th anniversary. However, Disney later confirmed on January 10, 2023, that Harmonious will retire on April 2, 2023, two days after the end of Walt Disney World's 50th anniversary celebration, and Epcot Forever taking back its place the night after.

Show summary

Act I: Gather 
The lit torches around the World Showcase Lagoon are extinguished and the park's lighting is dimmed. The show begins with a female vocalizing to the tune of the EPCOT Anthem. A female narrator begins speaking, as a clamor of voices vocalizing Disney arias and chants are heard:"All around us, the world is alive with music. Voices calling out in search of one another, we find each other in song." The clamor of voices then melds into a single crescendo and stops, leading into a multi-lingual medley of "How Far I'll Go" from Moana and "Go the Distance" from Hercules sung in English, Mandarin Chinese, Norwegian, German, Arabic, Latin American Spanish, and Tahitian. High-launch fireworks shells are used, while the fountains take on multiple colors. Abstract, colorful images cover the screens, before eventually transforming into an image of the morning sun and its rays at the end of the act.

Act II: Celebrate 
Guests are taken on a musical, globe-trotting journey across many countries and regions through the prism of the Disney stories that take place in each one. The songs that represent each country or region are performed by local artists and partially in their respective mother tongues, with their accompanying visuals interpreted in a unique style reminiscent of, and directly inspired by, each region.

Middle East 
This section celebrates the Middle Eastern folk tales that have inspired Disney's Aladdin.

A laser image of the Sultan's palace from Aladdin is projected on the mist screens above the screens. Images of swirling sands covers the screens, which reveals the Genie's lamp on the perimeter screens and the Cave of Wonders on the central screen. The moving arms on the perimeter screens are raised to form part of the lamp as its "spout" where four pink firework shells are launched. On the central screen, the mouth of the Cave of Wonders opens wide and as the image zooms forward, Arabic geometric patterns can be seen moving past. A dancing, stylized Genie (rendered in the style of Arabic calligraphy) appears on the central screen and "summons" the launching fireworks. More moving geometric patterns covers the screens before revealing the rooftops of Agrabah at nighttime and a silhouetted Aladdin and Jasmine riding the magic carpet. The Genie then returns to "summon" more fireworks on the perimeter screens before moving to the central screen to close the section.

India 
This section celebrates the ancient Indian fable texts that have partly inspired The Jungle Book, which was adapted into the 1967 Disney animated film of the same name.

Several orange searchlights and lasers flash as chanting and electronic beats plays overhead. The lights, lasers, and fountains take on a light green color as large, spiraling leaves cover the central screen. The spiraling leaf cover on the screens then parts to reveal a Tholu bommalata shadow play retelling of The Jungle Book. Dancing puppets of Baloo, King Louie, Mowgli, and the other animal and human characters, as well as swirling Indian patterns, are displayed on the screens. The fountains, searchlights, and lasers display alternating light green, orange, and blue light effects. A set of colorful fireworks are launched to close the section, as the images on the screens disappear in clouds of colorful smoke (similar to the ones used during the Holi festivities).

China 
This section celebrates the Chinese legends and literature that have inspired Disney's Mulan.

A traditional Chinese painting of a magnolia tree's branches and its falling flowers covers the screens. Continuing the motif, the characters of Mulan, Fa Zhou, Mushu, a riding Chinese army, and various Chinese landscapes covers the screens. The fountains are lit in white and pink. A red and white laser image of the Taijitu symbol also appears above the perimeter screens, as the music changes dramatically. The fountains are lit in red, as the screens displays real-life martial artists performing movements from Chinese martial arts against an intense red background. In addition to fireworks shells, firecrackers are also launched from the moving arms to create a "firecracker storm" above the central screen. The section closes with images of Mulan in her traditional pink and blue hanfu and her warrior disguise on the perimeter screens, and an image of her riding Khan (her horse) on the central screen.

Africa 
This section celebrates the African landscapes and fauna that have inspired Disney's The Lion King.

An African tapestry of a young Simba appears on the center screen, lit by circling pink, red, and purple fountains. Continuing the tapestry motif, a growing Simba is then seen traveling with Timon and Pumbaa and traversing the African landscape day and night across the screens. The fountains are lit in blue and red. A spinning continental map of Africa is then displayed on the central screen, while the animals of the Pride Lands can be seen traveling towards it on the perimeter screens. Red and green fireworks are shot off periodically to the beat of the music, while the fountains display blue and purple effects. A now-adult Simba and Nala can be seen frolicking in the forest, before the former encounters the spirit of Mufasa on the central screen and on the mist screen above it (through laser projection). The section closes with the images of Rafiki holding up a cub Simba over Pride Rock as Mufasa and Sarabi watch on the central screen and the animals bowing to him on the perimeter screens, as several red and green high-launch fireworks go off.

Europe 
The Europe section is divided into two subsections. The first subsection celebrates the French literature that has inspired two Disney films: Beauty and the Beast (adapted into the 1991 animated film of the same name) and The Hunchback of Notre-Dame (adapted into the 1996 animated film of the same name). The second subsection celebrates the Scottish mythology that has inspired Pixar's Brave.

Misty and dream-like images of Belle and the Beast slowly dancing in the ballroom covers the center screen, as a laser image of a rose appears above the central screen. The fountains are first lit in blue and pulsing yellow, and then red as the laser image changes into a heart. As a singular perimeter firework is shot from the top of the America Gardens Theatre, the images on the screens change to stained glass windows (similar to those found in Notre-Dame de Paris) depicting Quasimodo and the cathedral itself. The fountains display blue, pink, and white effects. Several high-launch fireworks are used in this subsection, in addition to large white fireworks.

The Ring of Stones is laser-projected above the central screen. As the fountains' blue lights are flickering, several will-o'-the-wisps appear on the screens. Animated woven tapestries depicting Merida, her family, the 3 clan leaders, and her family's crest are then displayed on the screens. The fountains are lit in brown and highlighted by green searchlights (depicting trees), before changing to a flickering blue and yellow. Several green and white fireworks are launched. The section closes with Merida riding Angus (her horse) across the perimeter screens and shooting an arrow to a target on the central screen, which triggers a set of green fireworks to go off.

Latin America 
This section celebrates the Latin American (specifically Mexican) cultural traditions that have inspired Pixar's Coco.

A close-up image of a self-strumming guitar displayed across the screens opens the section, before transitioning to that of the Rivera family ofrenda (a home altar used during the Día de Muertos celebrations) lit with candles and filled with flowers. The fountains are lit in yellow and orange to depict the candles. The cempasuchil (Mexican marigold) bridges then covers the screens, before changing into hung strings of colorful papel picado (decorative banners) with animated elements. The moving fountains display colorful water effects, specifically blue, yellow, red, pink, violet and peach effects. The screens then changes to show the swooshing folkorico skirts of real-life Mexican folk dancers, colorful calaveras (sugar skulls), and a close-up image of Pepita (Mamá Imelda's alebrije) with her wings unfurled. Multiple colorful fireworks, as well as high-launch ones, are used throughout the section. The section closes with a motif-pattern of colorful guitars and Miguel strumming a guitar while cempasuchil petals fly around him.

U.S.A. 
This section celebrates aspects of African-American culture that have inspired Disney's The Princess and the Frog.

Silhouetted images of a young and adult Tiana wishing on the Evening Star can be seen on the screens, as well as images of the bayou of New Orleans filled with fireflies. The fountains display bright purple and blue effects. As the music changes to be more upbeat, Louis the Alligator can be seen on the central screen playing his trumpet as laser images of colorful music notes are projected on the mist screens above. Fantastical imagery of the bayou and its dancing inhabitants (including Tiana and Naveen in their frog forms) — inspired by the work of Harlem Renaissance artist Aaron Douglas — then covers the screens, as flashing purple fountains, yellow and orange searchlights, and launched white fireworks move to the music. The setting on the screens then changes to show downtown New Orleans, including a paddle steamer and several streetcars. The fountains are lit in blue, while purple, blue, orange, and yellow searchlights color the skies. A flyer advertising "Tiana's Place" flies into view as the setting changes into a recreation of the "Almost There" sequence from the film. Multiple large, colorful firework shells, as well as several comets, are launched during this segment. Flashing pink and yellow and blue and green searchlights accentuate the scene. Silhouetted figures of The Firefly Five Plus Lou band, as well as a dancing Naveen in his human form, can also be seen on the perimeter screens. More colorful fireworks are launched as Tiana dances on the central screen while falling shimmering gold dust covers the perimeter screens to close the section.

Act III: Unite 
A vocalizing reprise of the EPCOT Anthem leads into a soaring version of “Someday” from The Hunchback of Notre Dame. Select artists perform each verse, and another comet flies to the center of the lagoon from the roof of the American Gardens Theater. The narrator intones:“You raise your voice and it’s enough to lift the human spirit. Set the song inside you soaring, and the whole wide world will hear it.”A laser heart is projected over the central barge, which slowly morphs into a flying dove of peace; a globe appears on the water curtain and all the screens around it. All the artists join as fireworks are launched in and around the lagoon. As the song crescendos, it abruptly cuts to three seconds of darkness and silence before climaxing in a bright array of fireworks, voices, and light.

Post-show 
The show ends with a farewell message from the narrator:“Wherever the world leads you next, we hope you carry a song with you. And know, that the promise of someday, begins inside of you today. Good night.”An instrumental version of "Someday" then plays as guests exit the park. This is then followed by an upbeat medley of song samples from the show, including "Circle of Life", the EPCOT Anthem, "Arabian Nights", "Saludos Amigos", and "The World Es Mi Familia". While the perimeter screens are covered with spinning stars, the central screen shows corresponding key visuals for each song sample. For Walt Disney World's 50th Anniversary celebration, the medley is followed by a version of "The Magic Is Calling", the celebration's anthem.

Show elements 

Harmonious shares similar show equipment with the former IllumiNations: Reflections of Earth show as well as its predecessors, including the usage of pyrotechnics, choreographed water fountains, lasers, searchlights, floating set pieces, and LED screens.

Compass 
The show's primary show equipment is housed on a collective of floating barges known as the "compass", named as such due to its positioning on the World Showcase Lagoon. These barges form the perimeter of the barge collective and are positioned in the ordinal directions. Each barge is named after the nearest intersecting World Showcase pavilion: Mexico (pointing northeast), Germany (southeast), Canada (northwest), and France (southwest). The centerpiece platform, positioned at the center of the collective, holds a six-story tall ring structure where a high-density water curtain, moving lights, and several water fountains are installed.

As the collective of barges is too large to store in the backstage marina (located behind the Refreshment Outpost quick service restaurant and between the China and Germany pavilions), they remain semi-permanently moored at the center of the lagoon. At daytime, the perimeter screens are turned on to show the undersea imagery from Act I with the Walt Disney World 50th Anniversary logo periodically appearing and disappearing. Initially, the plan was to simply turn on the fountains to add to the ambiance of World Showcase.

Special editions

New Year's Eve Countdown Edition 
This segment, which was a tag after IllumiNations: Reflections of Earth, was used as a standalone show in New Year's Eve 2021 and 2022 titled Cheers to the New Year: A Sparkling Celebration, using the show's materials and barges.

Fourth of July 
On July 4, 2022, the Independence Day tag that was used from 2006 to 2019 for IllumiNations: Reflections of Earth was used again after the show's regular performance, enhanced with the new technology brought about by the show's infrastructure.

Music

Soundtrack 
Unique to the musical score of Harmonious is the involvement of over 240 musicians, composers, arrangers, vocalists and more from nine countries in its creation and development. In addition, Disney worked with different cultural consultants to ensure that a more authentic sound is achieved in the reinterpretation of various Disney songs. Featured songwriters in the Harmonious score include Kristen Anderson-Lopez, Elton John, Robert Lopez, Alan Menken, Lin-Manuel Miranda, Randy Newman, and Stephen Schwartz. The score is orchestrated by David Hamilton, a frequent collaborator of music producer Mark Hammond, particularly from World of Color.

The entire soundtrack for the show, with selected extended musical sequences and without the show's narration, was released in a soundtrack album by Walt Disney Records on October 29, 2021.

Track listing

See also 
Disneyland Forever
Fantasmic
Rivers of Light
World of Color

References

External links
 Official site

Epcot
World Showcase
Walt Disney Parks and Resorts fireworks
Amusement park attractions introduced in 2021
Amusement park attractions that closed in 2023
2021 establishments in Florida
2023 disestablishments in Florida
Walt Disney Parks and Resorts entertainment